The Men's Shot Put F42 had its Final held on September 10 at 17:30.

Medalists

Results

References
Final

Athletics at the 2008 Summer Paralympics